The 1992 Toledo Rockets football team was an American football team that represented the University of Toledo in the Mid-American Conference (MAC) during the 1992 NCAA Division I-A football season. In their second season under head coach Gary Pinkel, the Rockets compiled an 8–3 record (5–3 against MAC opponents), finished in a tie for third place in the MAC, and outscored all opponents by a combined total of 269 to 153.

The team's statistical leaders included Kevin Meger with 1,727 passing yards, Casey McBeth with 1,037 rushing yards, and Marcus Goodwin with 738 receiving yards.

Schedule

References

Toledo
Toledo Rockets football seasons
Toledo Rockets football